Devulapalli Krishnasastri (1 November 1897 – 24 February 1980) was a Telugu poet, playwright and translator known for his works in Telugu literature and Telugu cinema. He is known as Andhra Shelley. In 1976, Krishnasastri was honoured with Padma Bhushan, third highest civilian award in India. In 1978, he received Sahitya Akademi Award for his literary works.

Early life
Krishnasastri was born on 1 November 1897 in Ramachandrapalem of East Godavari, India. He was brought up in Pithapuram in a family of court-poets. He grew interest in English literature while he was in his high school.

Career
Krishnasastri started writing poetry from a very young age. Krishnasastri's works changed significantly after he met Rabindranath Tagore at Santiniketan in 1929. Krishnasastri joined All India Radio in 1945 and wrote a number of plays for it.

He also translated Goda Devi's Tamil Tiruppavai into Telugu Keertanaas. Other translations of Tiruppavai are available - but they are all word for word. His translation is unique because he had taken the central idea of each Pasuram, made it into Pallavi and wove around it the rest of the paasuram into anupallavi and charanam(s). They were set to pure carnatic music, even as they were composed, by Amruthavalli Sundaram. The publication with notation, is Orient Longman.

He died on 24 February 1980.

Literary works
Some of Krishnasastri's famous works include :
Amrutha Veena (1992)
Appude Putti Vunte 
Aruna Ratham 
Badarika 
Bahukaala Darshanam 
Dhanurdasu 
Gorinta 
Mangala Kahali 
Sri Vidyapathi 
Krishnapaksham - Urvashi pravasam 
Sharmishta 
Vyaasavali - Kavi parampara 
Sri Andallu Tiruppavu Kirtanalu (1993)
 Meghamala (1996)
Krishna Paksham (The Darkening Fortnight),
Pravasam (Alien Residence),
Mahati (The Veena of Narada),
Urvasi.

Films
Krishnasastri entered the film industry by scripting the 1951 Telugu film  Malliswari. He gave lyrics to about 160 songs in over 70 films during the 1950s to 1970s. They include Malleswari, Naa Illu, En Veedu, Bangaru Papa, Ekaveera, Bhagya Rekha (1957), Rakta Kanneeru, Bhakta Tukaram, Karthika Deepam, Gorintaku, Megha Sandesam, Sri Rama Pattabhishekam.

Awards
Nandi Awards
Best Lyricist - Seetamalakshmi (1978) 
Best Lyricist - Meghasandesam (1982)

Other Awards
 Andhra University has conferred the title Kala Prapoorna (The complete artist) on him in 1975.
 He was awarded the Sahitya Akademi Award.
 Krishnashastri also won the Padma Bhushan Award in the year 1976.

References

External links
 
 Krishnasastriyam  is a novel musical interpretation of some songs written by Sri Krishnasastri. Excerpts available at the linked site.
 .

1890s births
1980 deaths
Recipients of the Sahitya Akademi Award in Telugu
Recipients of the Padma Bhushan in literature & education
Telugu-language lyricists
Telugu poets
Hindu poets
People from East Godavari district
Indian male poets
20th-century Indian poets
Poets from Andhra Pradesh
20th-century Indian male writers
Tamil–Telugu translators